VOX is a Scandinavian television channel owned by Warner Bros. Discovery EMEA.

The channel was launched in January 2012 and targets adults over 30.

Programs
List of programs broadcast by VOX

References

External links
 

Television channels in Norway
Television channels and stations established in 2012
2012 establishments in Norway
Warner Bros. Discovery networks
Warner Bros. Discovery EMEA